Alain Anziani (born 30 May 1951) is a member of the Senate of France, representing the Gironde department.  He is a member of the Socialist Party.

References
Page on the Senate website

1951 births
Living people
Socialist Party (France) politicians
French Senators of the Fifth Republic
Senators of Gironde